Mahip Marwaha is an Indian television actor. He appeared in Bollywood movie, Rabba Main Kya Karoon and shows like Parichay (TV series) and Parvarrish – Kuchh Khattee Kuchh Meethi

References

Male actors in Hindi television
Living people
Indian male soap opera actors
Male actors from Mumbai
1988 births